is a former Japanese football player.

Club statistics

References

External links

1985 births
Living people
Association football people from Toyama Prefecture
Japanese footballers
J1 League players
J2 League players
Japan Football League players
Yokohama FC players
Giravanz Kitakyushu players
Tokyo Verdy players
Association football defenders